Matt Jones (born November 1, 1981) is an American actor and comedian, known for his portrayals of Brandon "Badger" Mayhew on the AMC crime drama series Breaking Bad, Baxter on the CBS sitcom Mom, and Ned Dorneget in NCIS. He stars as Douglas Wheeler on the CBS sitcom Bob Hearts Abishola, and is also known for his voice roles as Gunther Magnuson in Kick Buttowski: Suburban Daredevil (2010–2012), Hector Flanagan in Sanjay and Craig (2013–2016), Nuber in F Is for Family (2018–2020), and Wedge in the video game Final Fantasy VII Remake (2020).

Early life
Jones was born in Sacramento, California and grew up in Pomona, California, one of ten children between his mother and stepfather. He eventually moved to Claremont and graduated from Claremont High School in 2000.

During this time he started Ultimate Improv in Westwood, before auditioning for Boom Chicago in Amsterdam, where he performed for three years. Due to Boom's rigorous touring schedule, he frequently lost his voice, which eventually became permanently raspy.

Career
Jones was the singer/main songwriter of the Christian ska band Faculty Four. Before leaving for Boom Chicago, Jones appeared in 20 commercials in two years, including a spot for Midas, and has appeared in more than 40 commercials overall. After returning, his first theatrical audition was for the AMC crime drama series Breaking Bad.

From 2008 to 2013, Jones appeared in a recurring role as Brandon "Badger" Mayhew on Breaking Bad. He appeared as a pizza delivery boy on How I Met Your Mother, and has appeared on Comedy Central's Reno 911! and the NBC comedy series Community. He appeared in the pilot episode of the Comedy Central sketch series Key & Peele. He is also a regular performer at the Upright Citizens Brigade Theater and I.O. West.

In 2010, Jones was cast in the lead role in the TBS pilot Uncle Nigel, written and produced by Andy Breckman. He has provided voices on the Cartoon Network series Adventure Time. In 2010, he was also cast as one of the lead roles in the Disney XD show Kick Buttowski: Suburban Daredevil, as the title character's best friend Gunther Magnuson. He appeared in the 2011 film Red State, and voiced minor characters in the 2011 video game Rage. Jones also appeared as Probationary Agent Ned Dorneget in the CBS show NCIS, between 2011 and 2015. In early 2012, Jones was cast in Steven Levitan's new pilot Rebounding for FOX, but the show was not picked up.

Jones appeared in four episodes of The Office ("Junior Salesman", "The Farm", and the two-part series finale). He was cast as a series regular in The Farm, a failed spin-off of The Office. While in the UK to direct Borderline in 2016, Jones appeared in two episodes of character comedy podcast Fact Up. He portrayed Baxter in the CBS sitcom Mom. In 2018, he starred in the Pop television series Let's Get Physical as Joe Force.

In 2019, he became a cast member on the sitcom Bob Hearts Abishola.

He is the voice of the Boov Kyle in DreamWorks Animation film Home and its spinoff series Home: Adventures with Tip & Oh. He is the voice of the character Wedge in Final Fantasy VII Remake (2020).

Personal life
Jones married actress Kelly Daly in 2012. They have one son together, Jasper (born 2015). They divorced in 2017.
He later married actress Kristen Hager December 21, 2020. They have 1 daughter together, Jolene (born 2022).

Filmography

Film

Television

Video games

References

External links
 
 Matt Jones Reddit Questionnaire (November 16, 2011)

21st-century American male actors
Male actors from Sacramento, California
Living people
American male comedians
American male film actors
American male television actors
American male voice actors
People from Claremont, California
People from Pomona, California
Comedians from California
Upright Citizens Brigade Theater performers
21st-century American comedians
1981 births